A cutaneous nerve is a nerve that provides nerve supply to the skin.

Human anatomy

In human anatomy, cutaneous nerves are primarily responsible for providing sensory innervation to the skin.  In addition to sympathetic and autonomic afferent (sensory) fibers, most cutaneous nerves also contain sympathetic efferent (visceromotor) fibers, which innervate cutaneous blood vessels, sweat glands, and the arrector pilli muscles of hair follicles. These structures are important to the sympathetic nervous response.

There are many cutaneous nerves  in the human body, only some of which are named.
Some of the larger cutaneous nerves are as follows:

Upper body

 In the arm (proper)
 Superior lateral cutaneous nerve of arm (Superior LCNOA)
 Inferior lateral cutaneous nerve of arm (Inferior LCNOA)
 Posterior cutaneous nerve of arm (PCNOA)
 Medial cutaneous nerve of arm (MCNOA)
 In the forearm
 Lateral cutaneous nerve of forearm (LCNOF)
 Posterior cutaneous nerve of forearm (PCNOF)
 Medial cutaneous nerve of forearm (MCNOF)

Lower body

 In the thigh
 Lateral cutaneous nerve of thigh (LCNOT)
 Posterior cutaneous nerve of thigh (PCNOT)

Other
In the torso
 Ventral cutaneous branches
 Lateral cutaneous branches
 Dorsal cutaneous branches
In the neck & head:
Supraorbital nerve
Infraorbital nerve
Mental nerve
Buccal nerve
Auriculotemporal nerve
Supraclavicular nerves (C3, C4)
Great auricular nerve (C2, C3)
Greater occipital nerve (C2)

References 

Peripheral nervous system